Matthew Maurice Lindblad (born March 23, 1990) is an American former professional ice hockey forward. He is currently a professional scout for the Boston Bruins, having played four games with the Bruins in the National Hockey League (NHL).

Playing career
Prior to turning professional, Lindblad attended the Dartmouth College where he played three seasons (2010–2013) of NCAA Division I hockey with the Dartmouth Big Green, registering 29 goals, 51 assists, 80 points, and 8 penalty minutes in 89 games played.

On April 5, 2013, the Boston Bruins of the National Hockey League signed Lindblad as a free agent to an entry-level contract. On February 24, 2014, the Bruins recalled Lindblad from their AHL affiliate in Providence, only to be returned to the AHL without seeing NHL action. He finally made his NHL debut on March 15, 2014, playing left wing on the Bruins' fourth-line in a 5–1 win over the Carolina Hurricanes.

On July 1, 2015, Lindblad left the Bruins organization as a free agent and signed a one-year, two-way deal with the New York Rangers. In the 2015–16 season, Lindblad was limited to just eight games with AHL affiliate, the Hartford Wolf Pack, due to numerous injuries.

At the conclusion of his contract with the Rangers, Lindblad opted to end his playing career. On September 15, 2016, the Boston Bruins announced that Lindblad would be returning to the organization as a professional scout.

Career statistics

References

External links
 

1990 births
Living people
American men's ice hockey left wingers
Boston Bruins players
Boston Bruins scouts
Chicago Steel players
Dartmouth Big Green men's ice hockey players
Hartford Wolf Pack players
Providence Bruins players
Sioux Falls Stampede players
Sportspeople from Evanston, Illinois
Undrafted National Hockey League players